It Had to Do with Love is the first studio album by the American indie rock band Koufax. It was released in 2000 on Vagrant Records.

Background
While the previous, self-titled debut EP was released by Doghouse, the debut album was distributed by Vagrant Records, respectively their subsidiary Heroes & Villains. The contract with Vagrant was made with the help of the friendly band The Get Up Kids.

Track listing

Reception
The album received positive to mixed reviews:

"It Had to Do With Love, helped to set into motion the current trend of indie bands wanting to sound like Joe Jackson; it may not have been the biggest selling record in Vagrant’s history, but it was one of the best written, thoughtful, and properly performed pop albums ever to be released by the label." – Ink19

Allmusic writer Vincent Jeffries  gave the album 3 out of 5 stars and states: "Koufax draws heavily from '70s synth-rock and pop-prog artists like ELO, Supertramp, and perhaps some early Genesis to piece together their keyboard excursions. …It Had to Do With Love might sound silly, or even boring to hardcore emo or indie fans, however, listeners who treasure bolder, more eclectic recordings will enjoy this pop experiment." – Allmusic

Personnel

The Band
 Robert Suchan – vocals, guitar
 Jared Rosenberg – piano, keyboards, organ
 Sean Grogan – synthesizers, keyboard, organ
 Andrew Cameron – bass
 Dave Shettler – drums, theremin, background vocals

Additional musicians 
 Louis Castle – trumpet

Technical
 Dave Trumfio – production, recording
 Ramón Bretón – mastering
 Anthony Arvizu, Pete Magdaleno – engineering [assistant]

References

2000 albums
Koufax (band) albums